Leslie Marx (born April 24, 1967) is an American fencer and professor of Economics at Duke University.

Fencing 
Marx competed in the women's individual and team épée events at the 1996 Summer Olympics. She won gold medals at the 1995 Pan American Games in the women's individual and team épée events. In 2017 Marx returned to international competition, winning the gold medal at the 2017 Veteran Fencing World Championships in the women's epee 50-59 event and in the team event.

Research 
Marx is the Robert A. Bandeen Professor of Economics at the Fuqua School of Business at Duke University. Her research topics include game theory and industrial organization. In particular, her work focuses on the problem of anti-competitive behavior by individuals and firms, including collusion, bid rigging, and anti-competitive contract provisions.

See also
List of USFA Division I National Champions

References

External links
 

1967 births
Living people
American female épée fencers
Olympic fencers of the United States
Fencers at the 1996 Summer Olympics
Sportspeople from Fairfax County, Virginia
Pan American Games medalists in fencing
Pan American Games gold medalists for the United States
People from Fort Belvoir, Virginia
Fencers at the 1995 Pan American Games
Medalists at the 1995 Pan American Games
21st-century American women